Ocean is an Italian television series.

Cast

 Irene Papas
 Mario Adorf 
 William Berger
 Lou Castel 
 Anna Kanakis 
 David Hess
 Adam Arkin
 Martin Balsam
 Marisa Berenson
 Senta Berger 
 Ernest Borgnine

See also
List of Italian television series

External links
 

Italian television series